Intelsat 707 (also known as IS-707 and Intelsat 7-F7) is a geostationary communications satellite that was built by Space Systems/Loral (SSL). It is located in the orbital position of 53° west longitude.. The satellite is owned by Intelsat. The satellite was based on the LS-1300 platform and its estimated useful life was 15 years.

Launch 
The satellite was successfully launched into space on 14 March 1996, at 07:11:01 UTC, using an Ariane 4 vehicle from the Guiana Space Centre, Kourou, French Guiana. It had a launch mass of 4,180 kg. The Intelsat 707 carried 26 C-band and 14 Ku-band transponders to provide Europe and the Americas with 3 television channels and 22,500 telephone circuits after parking over the eastern coast of Brazil.

See also 

 1996 in spaceflight

References

External links 
 Intelsat 707 TBS satellite
 Intelsat 707 SatBeams

Spacecraft launched in 1996
Intelsat satellites